Postal codes in Andorra were introduced in July 2004. As postal services in Andorra are run by Correos of Spain and La Poste of France, postal codes were introduced in cooperation with both countries' postal administrations. Each of the seven parishes of Andorra has its own post code (or codi postal in Catalan).

PO Boxes in  Andorra la Vella have separate postcodes allocated to each group of 50 boxes - e.g., boxes 1001 to 1050 have a code of AD551, 1051 to 1100 a code of AD552 etc.

References

Andorra
Postal system of Andorra